The Kasturba Hospital was started in 1945 by Dr Sushila Nayyar. It is a 1000-bed hospital, located in Sevagram, about 8 km from Wardha, and offers tertiary care healthcare facilities to rural patients.

In 1969, the Mahatma Gandhi Institute of Medical Sciences, a medical school, was founded and attached to the Kasturba Hospital.

Hospital Information System
The entire hospital has been computerized since 2004. The HIS (Hospital Information System) was developed by the CDAC, Noida. All the patient information and reports are now online, improving professional access and greatly reducing the paper-based record keeping.

References

Hospital buildings completed in 1945
Hospitals in Maharashtra
Hospitals established in 1945
Wardha district
Memorials to Kasturba Gandhi
1945 establishments in India
20th-century architecture in India